Dmytro Vitaliyovych Makhnyev is a Ukrainian professional footballer who plays as a centre-back for Karpaty Lviv.

Early life 
Dmytro Vitaliyovych Makhnyev was born on 2 March,1996 in Dniprepotrevosk, Ukrain.

Career
In summer 2022, he moved to Karpaty Lviv as a center-back.

References

External links
 
 
 

1996 births
Living people
Footballers from Dnipro
Ukrainian footballers
FC Sevastopol players
FC Hoverla Uzhhorod players
BFC Daugavpils players
FC Nikopol players
FC Enerhiya Nova Kakhovka players
NK Veres Rivne players
FC Karpaty Lviv players
Ukrainian Premier League players
Ukrainian First League players
Ukrainian Second League players
Latvian Higher League players
Ukrainian expatriate footballers
Expatriate footballers in Latvia
Ukrainian expatriate sportspeople in Latvia
Association football defenders